FC SKA Rostov-on-Don is a Russian association football club based in Rostov-on-Don. The club's history includes becoming runners-up of the Soviet Top League in 1966 and winning the Soviet Cup in 1981.

History

The club was founded on 27 August 1937 and was known as RODKA (1937–1953), ODO (1954–1956) and SKVO (1957–1959 and 2013–2015). The team was given its most familiar name back in March 2015.

SKVO entered the Class B of the Soviet league in 1958. Prior to that, the team only played in regional tournaments. SKVO became the champions of Class B in 1958 and were promoted to Class A. They stayed at the top level of Soviet football until 1973, winning silver medals in 1966 and finishing fourth in 1959, 1960, 1963, and 1964.

In the 1970s and 1980s SKA moved between Top and First leagues several times. After relegation 1973, they played in the First League in 1974, 1976–1978, 1982–1983, and 1986–1989, and in the Top League in 1975, 1979–1981, and 1984–1985. SKA spent two last years of the Soviet football (1990 and 1991) in the Second League.

SKA were also successful in the Soviet Cup. They won the trophy in 1981 and were the losing finalists in 1969 and 1971.

After entering the Russian Second Division, SKA have been playing there with a few exceptions: they played in the Third Division in 1994, in the Amateur Football League in 1998, and in the First Division in 2002. In 2002 SKA finished 17th in the First Division, going straight back down but recording the best result in Russian football. It finished 2nd South Zone of Second Division but returned First Division after relegations of Dynamo Makhachkala, FC Volgar-Gazprom Astrakhan and Lada Togliatti due to their licences were refused. It finished 17th in 2007 and 13th in 2008. Despite finishing outside of relegation zone in 2008, the club could not afford to play in the First Division for 2009 and volunteered to get relegated to the Second Division for 2009. After playing on that level from 2009 to 2013–14 seasons, the club failed professional licensing and began the 2014–15 season in the Russian Amateur Football League. It returned to the third-tier Russian Professional Football League for the 2015–16 season.

Awards
Soviet Top League
Runners-up (1): 1966
Soviet Cup
Winners (1): 1981
Runners-up (2): 1969, 1971
Soviet First League
Winners (1): 1958
Runners-up (3): 1974, 1978, 1983

League history

Soviet Union

Russia

European record
Cup Winners' Cup

Current squad
As of 21 February 2023, according to the official Second League website.

References

 
Association football clubs established in 1937
Football clubs in Russia
Sport in Rostov-on-Don
Armed Forces sports society
1937 establishments in Russia
Military association football clubs in Russia
Soviet Top League clubs